The volleyball jump serve is a type of volleyball serve where the player increases the power and height of their serve by jumping into the hit. Renan Dal Zotto, a former Brazilian volleyball player, is known to have invented the jump serve.

External links
Jump Serve Volleyball Videos

Jump serve
pt:Viagem ao fundo do mar (voleibol)